Just Us Kids is an album by singer-songwriter James McMurtry.  It was nominated at the 2008 Americana Music Association for Album of the Year, Song of the Year ("Cheney's Toy") and earned McMurtry a nomination for Artist of the Year.

Track listing
All songs written by James McMurtry unless otherwise noted.

"Bayou Tortous" – 4:52
"Just Us Kids" – 5:10
"God Bless America (Pat MacDonald Must Die)" – 5:03
"Cheney's Toy" – 5:51
"Freeway View" – 3:40
"Hurricane Party" – 5:58
"Ruby and Carlos" – 6:38
"Brief Intermission" (McMurtry, Daren Hess, Ronnie Johnson) – 2:53
"Fire Line Road" (McMurtry, Tim Holt) – 5:32
"The Governor" – 5:53
"Ruins of the Realm" – 4:27 
"You'd A' Thought (Leonard Cohen Must Die)" – 5:17

Personnel
James McMurtry: lead vocal, guitars, mandoguitar, banjo, mandolin, dulcimer, 
Ronnie Johnson:  4 string and 8 string bass guitars, vocals, 
Daren Hess: drums, percussion, tympany, whistle
Ian McLagan: organ, piano
Harmoni Kelly: vocals
Brian Standefer: cello
Chris Maresh: bass viol
Jon Dee Graham: lap steel
Pat MacDonald: harmonicas, vocals, 
Ephraim Owens: trumpet
Charlie Richards: guitar, lap steel
Lee Scott: vocals
John Nelson: percussion
Curtis McMurtry: baritone saxophone
C.C. Adcock: guitar

References

External links
James McMurtry – information regarding James McMurtry and The Heartless Bastards.

James McMurtry albums
2008 albums
Lightning Rod Records albums